Joginder Paul (5 September 1925 – 23 April 2016) was an Urdu writer. He had written several short stories, novels. His first short story was Before Sacrifice.

 Career 
Paul was born on 5 September 1925 in Saikot, Pakistan. His career started with Ek Boond Lahoo Ki which got published in Karachi in August 1962. In 1964, he returned to India as a full time writer. He was the Principal of Aurangabad college. He died on 23 April 2016.

 Works 
Novels
 Ek Boond Lahoo Ki Nadid Paar Pare and KhwabroBooks
 The Dying Sun Short stories 
 Khula 
 Khodu Baba Ka Maqbara Bastian''

Awards
 SAARC Lifetime Award for his contribution to literature
 Iqbal Samman
 Urdu Academy Award
 All India Bahadur Shah Zafar Award
 The Ghalib Award

References 

1925 births
Indian male writers
Indian male novelists
2016 deaths